Events from the year 1992 in North Korea.

Incumbents
Premier: Yon Hyong-muk (until 12 December), Kang Song-san (starting 12 December)
Supreme Leader: Kim Il-sung

Events
Some North Korean students in Moscow attempted a failed coup d'état.
15 April – 80th Birthday of Kim Il-sung celebrations

Births

 17 April - So Hyon-uk.
 12 November - Kye Song-hyok.
 12 November - Om Chol-song.
 25 November - Choe Won.

References

 
North Korea
1990s in North Korea
Years of the 20th century in North Korea
North Korea